Faridoon may refer to:
 Fereydun
 Shahnameh